The Texas Cowboys is an honorary student organization at the University of Texas that is currently suspended due to hazing violations. The organization was founded in 1922 by Arno Nowotny and Bill McGill, with the purpose of serving the University of Texas, as well as the surrounding area, with the motto: "Give the best you have to Texas, and the best will come back to you." Prior to its suspension in 2019, it was considered one of the "oldest and most elite student organizations" at the university, according to the Dallas Morning News. The Texas Cowboys served as ambassadors of the University of Texas and were present at numerous significant university-sponsored events.

The Texas Cowboys are most well-known for their responsibility keeping and maintaining Smokey the Cannon, which is present at all Texas Longhorns home football games. Smokey is fired off after "The Eyes of Texas", at the end of every quarter, and after all Texas touchdowns, field goals, kickoffs, and two-point conversions.

History
In 1922, two students at the University of Texas at Austin decided to form a club. These two men were head cheerleader Arno Nowotny and Longhorn Band president Bill McGill. In 1922, forty men from all aspects of campus life were chosen by McGill and Nowotny to be the first Texas Cowboys. Throughout its nearly 100 years of existence, becoming a Texas Cowboy became a high honor to its members.

The Texas Cowboys quickly adopted a set of rituals, including using a branding iron to brand themselves on their chests with the organization's logo, paddling, and chasing each other around town to kidnap and then abandon the captured member in the woods, distant roadside, or Town Lake.

In 1953 Smokey the Cannon was created by The University of Texas at Austin's mechanical engineering lab in response to the shotgun blasts often heard at the Red River Rivalry and was then presented in 1954 to the University of Texas by the Texas Cowboys. That same year, the Cowboys began their involvement with and support of The Arc of the Capital Area.

In 1955 Smokey was modified to shoot twin 10-gauge shotgun shells and the revision was renamed "Smokey II" which you can fine a replica at the Texas Cowboys Pavilion and the original in the Denius Hall of Fame at the North Endzone of the DKR Memorial Stadium.  Smokey II served the University well until 1988.

On the Monday following the assassination of President John F. Kennedy in 1963, Smokey fired a 21-gun salute to the fallen President during the climactic moment in a public ceremony in front of the state Capitol building.

In 1988, Smokey III, a civil war replica cannon standing six feet tall, weighing 1,200 pounds, and fires four 10-gauge shotgun shells was constructed by Lupton Machine and remains in service to this day.

In 1995, the Texas Cowboys were suspended from the UT campus for five years after one of their New Men, Gabe Higgins, died during a retreat. Independent investigators determined that the Texas Cowboys engaged in eight hazing violations.  The organization was already on probation for hazing at the time, and this was the third penalty for hazing in as many years. The death of Gabe Higgins, and the ritualized abuse forced on him by the Texas Cowboys, was documented by the young man's mother in a story of his young life cut short by being a Texas Cowboy.

Through the efforts of the Texas Cowboys Alumni Association, the Texas Cowboys were reestablished in 2000 to represent and serve the University of Texas at Austin with spirit, character and leadership.

In 2019, the Texas Cowboys were suspended from the UT campus for six years after one of their New Men, Nicholas Cumberland, died in a car crash returning from a retreat held at a ranch outside of Austin. Nicholas's death prompted a university investigation into the retreat, which discovered multiple forms of hazing and led to the group's suspension.  The Texas Cowboys have accepted the terms of their suspension and are committed along with the university to ending hazing.

Additionally, the President of The University of Texas at Austin agrees to hold a meeting in January and August of each year, beginning in 2022, to evaluate whether the Texas Cowboys student organization may be reinstated at a point in time prior to the completion of the sanctioned suspension. The President will consider the Texas Cowboys alumni efforts to help the university eliminate hazing, the proposed future benefits to the university's efforts to eliminate hazing arising from a newly constituted Texas Cowboys student organization, and the merits of proposed reforms to the Texas Cowboys student organization and alumni association.

Distinguished alumni
Political and judicial figures
Dolph Briscoe - 41st Governor of Texas
Allan Shivers - 37th Governor of Texas
Lloyd Bentsen - Former United States Secretary of the Treasury, United States Senator from Texas, 1988 Vice Presidential Nominee
Donald Evans - Former United States Secretary of Commerce, chairman of the George W. Bush presidential campaign, chairman of the Board of Regents of the University of Texas System
Jack Brooks - Former member of the U.S. House of Representatives from Texas' 9th and 2nd districts
Frank N. Ikard - Former member of the U.S. House of Representatives from Texas' 13th district
Bob Armstrong - Former U.S. Under Secretary of the Interior, Texas Land Commissioner, and Texas state representative
George Bayoud - Former Secretary of State of Texas, real estate investor
Lloyd Hand - Former Chief of Protocol of the United States
Keith L. Brown - Former president of the Council of American Ambassadors, United States Ambassador to Denmark and Lesotho
Robert Strauss - Former United States Ambassador to the Soviet Union, chairman of the Democratic National Committee, chairman of the Jimmy Carter presidential campaign
Peter R. Coneway - Former United States Ambassador to Switzerland and Liechtenstein, prominent investment banker
John Hill - Former Chief Justice, Supreme Court of Texas, Texas Attorney General, Secretary of State of Texas
Barefoot Sanders - Retired Chief Judge, United States District Court
John Singleton - Retired Chief Judge, United States District Court
Sam Sparks - Federal Judge, United States District Court
Joe Greenhill - Former Chief Justice, Supreme Court of Texas
Four Price - Current member, Texas House of Representatives

University figures
Jack Blanton - Former regent of the University of Texas System, chairman and CEO of Scurlock Oil Company
Larry Faulkner - Former president of the University of Texas, former president of Houston Endowment Inc.
Ricardo Romo - President of the University of Texas at San Antonio
H. Scott Caven, Jr. - Former chairman of the Board of Regents of the University of Texas System
Wales Madden - Former regent of the University of Texas System
Patrick Oxford - Former regent of the University of Texas System
Howard N. Richards - Former regent of the University of Texas System
W. Page Keeton - Former attorney, dean of the University of Texas School of Law
Mike Perrin - Former Men's Athletics Director

Athletes and coaches
Tom Landry - Former head coach, Dallas Cowboys, member of the Pro Football Hall of Fame
David McWilliams - Former head football coach, University of Texas
Earl Campbell - Former running back, Heisman Trophy winner, member of the Pro Football Hall of Fame
Tommy Nobis - Former linebacker, Maxwell Award winner, member of the College Football Hall of Fame
Doug English - Former defensive tackle, 4-time Pro Bowl selection, member of the College Football Hall of Fame
Colt McCoy - Quarterback, New York Giants, Maxwell Award winner
Will Licon - Swimmer, 11-time NCAA Champion, American Record-holder, 2017 Big 12 Athlete of the Year
Cullen Loeffler - Long snapper, Minnesota Vikings
Daron Roberts - Former assistant coach, Cleveland Browns
Major Applewhite - Head Coach, University of Houston
James Saxton - College Football Hall of Fame

Others
James T. Willerson - President and medical director of The Texas Heart Institute
Denton Cooley - Renowned heart surgeon, founder of The Texas Heart Institute
Harley Clark - Former judge, attorney, and UT student body president; creator of the "Hook 'em Horns" hand sign
Benno C. Schmidt, Sr. - Former attorney and venture capitalist
Thomas Lumpkin - Former president of Gulf Oil
Ronald Steinhart - Retired chairman and CEO of the Commercial Banking Group of Bank One Corporation
Malcolm Wallace, former UT student body president, economist for the United States Department of Agriculture, and press secretary to then-United States Senator Lyndon B. Johnson.

See also
 Texas Silver Spurs

References

External links
Texas Panhellenic Fraternities http://www.texaspanhellenic.org/
Texas Cowboys Alumni Association http://www.texascowboys.org/

University of Texas at Austin